Cupra  (also spelled  Cubrar, Ikiperu, Kypra or Supra) was a chthonic fertility goddess of the ancient pre-Roman population of the Piceni and the Umbri, and may have been associated with Etruscan Uni.

Dedications to her have been found at Plestia (attested as matres ple(s)tinas) and Ripatransone, and in Cupramontana and Cupra Marittima, which are named after her.

Etymology
Her name could derive from the Greek Kupria, a name for Aphrodite. Another etymological possibility is from the same root of Roman god Cupid.

Legacy and influence
In the periodic table, copper's symbol is Cu, which derives from Cupra, Latin for copper.

Bibliography

 Betts, Eleanor. "Cubrar matrer: goddess of the Picenes?". In: Accordia Research Papers, 12 pp. 119–147. 2013.
 Bradley, Guy. Archaic sanctuaries in Umbria. In: Cahiers du Centre Gustave Glotz, 8, 1997. pp. 111-129. [DOI: https://doi.org/10.3406/ccgg.1997.1436]; [www.persee.fr/doc/ccgg_1016-9008_1997_num_8_1_1436]
 Capriotti, Tiziana. "Il santuario della dea Cupra a Cupra Maritima: una proposta di ubicazione". In: Hesperìa 26, Studi sulla grecità d'Occidente, a cura di Lorenzo Braccesi, Flavio Raviola e Giuseppe Sassatelli. Università di Padova (Facoltà di Lettere e Filosofa); Università di Bologna (Facoltà di Lettere e Filosofia). 2010. pp. 119-160.
 Colonna, G. "Il santuario di Cupra fra Etruschi, Greci, Umbri e Picenti". In: Paci G. (a cura di), Cupra Marittima e il suo territorio in età antica. Atti del Convegno di studi, "Picus", suppl. II. Tivoli. 1993. pp. 3-31.
 Christie, Neil. The Journal of Roman Studies 85 (1995): 300-01. doi:10.2307/301120.
 Delplace, Chirstine. La Romanisation du Picenum. L'exemple d'Urbs Salvia. Rome: École Française de Rome, 1993. 444 p. (Publications de l'École française de Rome, 177). [www.persee.fr/doc/efr_0000-0000_1993_ths_177_]
 Gagé Jean. La mort de Servius Tullius et le char de Tullia. In: Revue belge de philologie et d'histoire, tome 41, fasc. 1, 1963. pp. 25-62. [DOI: https://doi.org/10.3406/rbph.1963.2451]; [www.persee.fr/doc/rbph_0035-0818_1963_num_41_1_2451]
 Chronique — Kroniek. In: Revue belge de philologie et d'histoire, tome 47, fasc. 1, 1969. Antiquité — Oudheid. pp. 172-360. [www.persee.fr/doc/rbph_0035-0818_1969_num_47_1_2766]
 Galie, V. Grottammare e il culto della dea Cupra. Archeoclub Grottammare 1992, pp. 89.
 Lejeune, Michel. Noms osco-ombriens des eaux, des sources et des fontaines. In: L'Italie préromaine et la Rome républicaine. I. Mélanges offerts à Jacques Heurgon. Rome : École Française de Rome, 1976. pp. 551-571. (Publications de l'École française de Rome, 27 [www.persee.fr/doc/efr_0000-0000_1976_ant_27_1_1821])
 Rocchi, G. Il cippo di Cupra e il suo tempio. Sessualità e antropomorfismo dell'antica "Dea". Archeoclub d'Italia, sede di Cupra Marittima 1992, pp. 189.
 Susini, Giancarlo. Aspects de la romanisation de la Gaule cispadane : chute et survivance des Celtes. In: Comptes rendus des séances de l'Académie des Inscriptions et Belles-Lettres, 109e année, N. 1, 1965. pp. 143-163. [DOI: https://doi.org/10.3406/crai.1965.11831]; [www.persee.fr/doc/crai_0065-0536_1965_num_109_1_11831]
 Toutain, Jules. X. — Religions de la Grèce et de Rome. In: École pratique des hautes études, Section des sciences religieuses. Annuaire 1925-1926. 1924. pp. 41-45. [www.persee.fr/doc/ephe_0000-0002_1924_num_38_34_20114]
 Whatmough, Joshua. The Foundations of Roman Italy. Routledge. 2015. p. 241.

References

Italic goddesses
Fertility goddesses
Picenum